"River" is a song by American singer Miley Cyrus. It was released on March 13, 2023, through Columbia Records as the second single from Cyrus' eighth studio album Endless Summer Vacation (2023). It was written by Cyrus, Justin Tranter, and the song producers Kid Harpoon and Tyler Johnson.

Background and release
On December 31, 2022, while hosting her NBC live special Miley's New Year's Eve Party, Cyrus announced the release of the new single "Flowers". Following its January 12, 2023, release, the song experienced widespread critical acclaim, as well as a global commercial success despite minimal promotion. "Flowers" became Cyrus' second number one single in the United States, hitting the top spot on Billboard Hot 100 on chart issue January 28, staying there for six continuous weeks. A week prior to the lead single's release, the singer unveiled that her next album will be called Endless Summer Vacation with a release date of March 10. Three days before the album's release, Cyrus started teasing "River" through teasers released on her social media. She shared a part of the song's instrumental, as well as its lyrics.

Cyrus stated that "River" begun as a much sadder song, since its development started within a turbulent time in her life. However, as the result of parts she organized, the track "evolved from a trouble where it felt like it never stopped raining, to then raining down love". The singer added, that in order to take part in the event, [one] needed to  "bring [their] gay best friend". During the interview for Miley Cyrus – Endless Summer Vacation (Backyard Sessions), she admitted that "River" is about ejaculation. However this word was censored, resulting in theories regarding what she actually said. "River" shares the same production team as its previous single "Flowers" - it was produced by Kid Harpoon and Tyler Johnson, with additional writing done by the singer and Justin Tranter.

On March 13, 2023, it was officially serviced to adult contemporary radio and its hot and modern sub-formats in the United States. The song was also sent to contemporary hit radio in the country the following day.

Composition
"River" is a dance-pop and synth-pop song with elements of synthwave, post-disco and acid pop, described by Cyrus as a "dancefloor banger". The song features a Roland 303 acid line, pulsating synths, and guitars. Clashs Emily Swingle found it to be reminiscent of Cyrus's 2010 album Can't Be Tamed. Andrew Sacher of BrooklynVegan called the track a "retro synthpop banger," adding it would fit on her 2020 album Plastic Hearts. George Griffiths of the Official Charts Company described it as a "new wave-esque" tune, consisting of "wonky" instrumental inspired by 1980s synth-pop and electronic music.  Chris Willman of Variety noted the song for the inclusion of "retro synth sounds" and further found inspiration from the style of Giorgio Moroder. Uproxxs Alex Gonzalez wrote that it follows the "dance-ready theme established by 'Flowers. Nick Levine of NME felt that it "feels like a relative of her Stevie Nicks-inspired hit 'Midnight Sky'." Alexis Petridis of The Guardian called it an EDM anthem with "an undeniable dancefloor rush," despite its "tendency to flicker between squelchy video game sounds and out of kilter hip hop breaks." Mary Siroky of Consequence called it "the album's disco-inspired centerpiece", likening it to the 2020 albums Future Nostalgia by Dua Lipa and Chromatica by Lady Gaga.

Helen Brown of The Independent described the song as a "straightforward romancer about a paramour who's restored her faith after the love drought." Rolling Stone Brittany Spanos felt that it is "buzzing with the hope of new love and the end of sexual and romantic droughts."

"River" is written in the key of F major with a moderately fast tempo of 130 beats per minute. The song follows a chord progression of Bb - C - Bbmaj7/D - Cm7(add4) - Bb - C - Bbmaj7/D - Dm with 8 intro bars before the singer starts with "I got a new dress just to meet you downtown. Can you walk me through the park, just to show it off. I can pull my hair back in the tight way that you like..." lyrics.

Critical reception
Sal Cinquemani of Slant Magazine noted the song's "enticing, high-stakes chorus worthy of Cyrus's fierce vocals and personality." Pitchfork Shaad D'Souza called it one of the best songs on Endless Summer Vacation, adding: "Cyrus effectively showcases who she is at this point in her career: Mature but still messy, not above a theatrical turn of phrase ('You're pourin' down, baby, drown me out') and, very occasionally, still in tune with the big-hearted optimism that characterized her earlier music." David Cobbals of The Line of Best Fit called it a "confused mash of one too many ideas that leave it being more underwhelming than interesting."

Music video
The black-and-white music video for "River" was directed by Jacob Bixenman. On March 7, 2023 Cyrus announced its release date and shared a teaser video. The music video premiered on March 10, 2023. It features Cyrus in a black minidress, dancing under a spotlight on a raised, lit-up platform, joined by a group of shirtless men. Near the end, water begins to rain. Erica Gonzales of Elle called the video "sleek and sexy", while Billboards Glenn Rowley called it "moody".

Live performance
Cyrus performed "River" live for the first time, in the documentary concert special, Miley Cyrus – Endless Summer Vacation (Backyard Sessions), which was released on Disney+ on March 10, 2023.

Credits and personnel
Credits adapted from Tidal, Pitchfork and the liner notes of Endless Summer Vacation.

Recording
 Recorded at Ridgemont High, Los Angeles.
 Mixed at Windmill Lane Studios, Dublin.
 Mastered at Sterling Sound, Edgewater.

Personnel
 Miley Cyrus – vocals, songwriting, executive production
 Kid Harpoon – songwriting, production, drums, bass guitar, guitar, synth bass, synthesizer, drum programming, additional vocal
 Ivan Jackson – horns
 Tyler Johnson – songwriting, drum programming, synth bass, synthesizer, additional vocal
 Joe LaPorta – mastering engineering
 Brian Rajaratnam – engineering
 Mark "Spike" Stent – mixing engineering
 Justin Tranter – songwriting
 Matt Wolach – assistant engineering

Charts

Release history

References

2023 singles
2023 songs
Miley Cyrus songs
Columbia Records singles
Songs written by Miley Cyrus
Songs written by Justin Tranter
Songs written by Kid Harpoon
Songs written by Tyler Johnson (musician)
Song recordings produced by Kid Harpoon
Song recordings produced by Tyler Johnson (musician)
Black-and-white music videos